Rabindra Shiksha Sammillani Law College is a private or self financing law college situated at Subhashgram, South 24 Parganas, West Bengal. This college is affiliated to the University of Calcutta. It offers 5-year Integrated Course in Law leading to B.A. LL.B. degree which is approved by the Bar Council of India (BCI), New Delhi.

History
The college was established in 2003 by the Rabindra Shiksha Sammillani Samity, a registered charitable society of West Bengal.

See also 
Law Commission of India
List of colleges affiliated to the University of Calcutta
Education in India
Education in West Bengal

References

External links
Rabindra Shiksha Sammillani Law College

University of Calcutta affiliates
Educational institutions established in 2003
Law schools in West Bengal
2003 establishments in West Bengal